Abu Oweis is the founder and deputy commander of the Qatari-trained Tripoli Brigade in the 2011 Libyan civil war.

References

Living people
Libyan military personnel
Year of birth missing (living people)
Place of birth missing (living people)
National Liberation Army (Libya)
People of the First Libyan Civil War